The 1921 PGA Championship was the fourth PGA Championship, held September 27 to October 1 on Long Island at Inwood Country Club in Inwood, New York. The match play field of 32 consisted of the defending champion and the top qualifiers from the 1921 U.S. Open. The competition was five rounds of 36-hole matches in a single-elimination tournament.

Walter Hagen defeated Jim Barnes, 3 & 2, in the final, for the third of his eleven major titles. Barnes won the first two PGA titles in 1916 and 1919. Defending champion Jock Hutchison lost in the second round to Gene Sarazen, 8 & 7. Sarazen won consecutive titles in 1922 and 1923. After not entering in 1922 and losing the final in 1923, Hagen won four consecutive PGA Championships, starting in 1924.

Bracket 1

Bracket 2

Bracket 3

Bracket 4

Final four

References

External links
PGA Media Guide 2012
Results at golfobserver.com 
PGA.com – 1921 PGA Championship

PGA Championship
Golf in New York (state)
PGA Championship
PGA Championship
PGA Championship
PGA Championship
PGA Championship